Arnulf of Orléans, also known as Arnulfus Rufus, was a grammarian and poet of Latin active as a teacher in Orléans in the late twelfth century. He had a famous rivalry with Matthew of Vendôme.

In Arnulf's time, Orléans was a centre of classical learning in France. Matthew associated him with the monastery of Saint-Euverte. He taught the classics in the ancient grammatical style, as opposed to the new "logical" style. His lectures on Ovid, which made no effort to soften or obscure the poet's paganism, were criticized as un-Christian and corrupting to youth by Alexander of Villedieu. In his commentaries on Ovid (Metamorphoses, Fasti, Ars amatoria) and Lucan, which circulated widely, he is sharply critical of his predecessors. Arnulf is the likely author of the elegiac comedy Lidia and possibly also of Miles gloriosus.

Arnulf and Matthew's dispute seems to have involved insulting each other's poetry. Arnulf was not reticent to insult rivals, labelling one commentary as designed for "those who have been fooled by Fulco". Likewise, he vaunted his own skills by facetiously deriving his name from the expression ardua nulla fugiens (flying from no difficulty). Matthew came out the worst and relocated to Vendôme in 1175. He was, however, successful in damaging Arnulf's reputation with his writings. In his Ars poetica, the name Rufinus and the Latin word rufus (redhead) are used throughout to insult Arnulf. Matthew also makes lewd comments about Arnulf's wife or mistress, called Rufa and Thais. He says that Arnulf proves the proverb right: redheads are cheats who cannot be trusted. His attack and his technique were influential. Hugh Primas wrote a poem accusing a redhead (rufus) of cheating him at a game of dice; there is an anonymous poem from Paris that attacks "Rufus"; and Eberhard the German praised Matthew and dismissed "Rufus". Arnulf responded directly to Matthew's Ars in the prologue of Lidia.

Notes

Bibliography

Year of death unknown
Year of birth unknown
Writers from Orléans
12th-century Latin writers
Medieval Latin poets
12th-century linguists